Tanya Victoria Harding (born 23 January 1972 in Brisbane, Queensland) is an Australian softball player, who has competed for Australia at four consecutive Summer Olympics, starting in 1996. Three times she claimed a bronze medal (1996, 2000, 2008), and once a silver medal (2004).

Playing career

The Queenslander was ranked in the top five pitchers in the world for over a decade.

In 1995, Harding enrolled at UCLA for one quarter. She played on the squad that won the NCAA women's softball championships, defeating Arizona. She left the school after the tournament. She was named most valuable player for the championship tournament.

However, in 1997 UCLA was stripped of its 1995 title for scholarship violations. Three softball players had been granted soccer scholarships, putting the Bruins three over the limit for softball. Although the three players involved were not identified, it was believed that one of them was Harding. Runner-up Arizona was not declared the champion, as there was no way to determine if Arizona would have won had Harding not been involved. Officially, there is no champion for 1995.

In 2022, she was inducted into Sport Australia Hall of Fame.

Notes

External links
 Official website
 sports-reference
 NCAA Official History Division 1 Softball Champions

1972 births
Living people
Australian softball players
Medalists at the 1996 Summer Olympics
Medalists at the 2000 Summer Olympics
Medalists at the 2004 Summer Olympics
Medalists at the 2008 Summer Olympics
Olympic medalists in softball
Olympic softball players of Australia
Olympic silver medalists for Australia
Olympic bronze medalists for Australia
Softball players at the 1996 Summer Olympics
Softball players at the 2000 Summer Olympics
Softball players at the 2004 Summer Olympics
Softball players at the 2008 Summer Olympics
Sportspeople from Brisbane
Sportswomen from Queensland
UCLA Bruins softball players
Women's College World Series Most Outstanding Player Award winners
Sport Australia Hall of Fame inductees